The 38th National Assembly of Quebec was elected in the 2007 Quebec general election and sat from May 8, 2007 to November 5, 2008. Jean Charest (PLQ) was the Premier and Mario Dumont (ADQ) was the leader of the opposition.  It ended when the 2008 general election was called.

Member list
Cabinet Ministers are in Bold, Leaders are in Italics and the President of the National Assembly has a Dagger next to his name.

Notes

 Rosaire Bertrand MNA for Charlevoix resigned on August 13, 2007, to make way for a by-election later that year in which the new Parti Québécois leader, Pauline Marois, would be a candidate. 
 Diane Lemieux, who was the PQ House Leader resigned as MNA for Bourget on October 17, 2007 and replaced as House Leader by François Gendron. 
 André Boisclair resigned as MNA for Pointe-aux-Trembles on November 15, 2007.
 Roch Cholette announced his resignation as MNA for Hull on April 3, 2008 taking effect on April 9, 2008.
 Maryse Gaudreault for the Quebec Liberal Party was elected in Hull and Maka Kotto and Nicole Léger of the Parti Québécois were elected in Bourget and Pointe-aux-Trembles respectively during by-elections held on May 12, 2008. 
 Philippe Couillard resigned as MNA for Jean-Talon on June 25, 2008.
 Michel Bissonnet resigned as MNA for Jeanne-Mance-Viger on July 14, 2008.
 Yves Bolduc won the Jean-Talon by-election on September 29, 2008 with 58% of the popular vote. 
 Russell Copeman resigned as MNA for Notre-Dame-de-Grace on October 22, 2008. 
 André Riedl, MNA for Iberville, and Pierre-Michel Auger, MNA for Champlain crossed the floor from the ADQ to the Liberals on October 23, 2008.

Cabinet Ministers

 Premier and Executive Council President: Jean Charest
 Deputy Premier: Nathalie Normandeau
 Agriculture, Fisheries and Food: Laurent Lessard
 Employment and Social Solidarity: Sam Hamad
 Labor: David Whissell
 Government Administration, Government Services and President of the Treasury Board: Monique Jérôme-Forget
 Information Access:Benoît Pelletier
 Culture, Communications and Status of Women: Christine St-Pierre
 International Relations: Monique Gagnon-Tremblay
 Indian Affairs: Benoît Pelletier
 Canadian Francophonie: Benoît Pelletier
 Health and Social Services:  Philippe Couillard (2007-2008), Yves Bolduc (2008–present)
 Education: Michelle Courchesne
 Immigration and Cultural Communities: Yolande James
 Seniors: Marguerite Blais
 Family: Michelle Courchesne
 Transportation: Julie Boulet
 Canadian Intergovernmental Affairs: Benoît Pelletier
 Municipal Affairs and Regions: Nathalie Normandeau
 Democratic Institutions Reform: Benoît Pelletier
 Recreation and Sport: Michelle Courchesne
 Sustainable Development, Environment and Parks: Line Beauchamp
 Natural Resources and Wildlife: Claude Bechard
 Justice: Jacques P. Dupuis
 Public Safety: Jacques P. Dupuis
 Finances: Monique Jerome-Forget
 Revenue: Jean-Marc Fournier
 Tourism: Raymond Bachand
 Economic Development, Innovation and Export Trade : Raymond Bachand

See also
 2007 Quebec general election

External links
 Élections/Map of Quebec electoral districts
 Jean Charest Cabinet 
 List of Historical Cabinet ministers
 https://ojs.unbc.ca/index.php/cpsr/article/download/36/77

38